Twisted is the fourth studio album by Del Amitri, released on 28 February 1995. It reached number three in the UK Albums Chart and was listed by Q Magazine as one of the top 10 best albums of 1995.

It was the last album to feature guitarist David Cummings, who left to begin a successful career in TV scriptwriting, and the only to feature drummer Chris Sharrock, who agreed to play on Twisted but declined to join the band as a permanent member. With a firmer emphasis on electric guitars than the band's last outing, 1992's Change Everything, the album represented a moderate change of direction for Del Amitri, whilst retaining their trademark melodic sensibilities.

The album included Del Amitri's most successful single, "Roll to Me", which reached the top ten in the US Hot 100. The band are known not to consider the song one of their best, however, and have often seemed irked by the fact that what they see as a throwaway pop song gave them their biggest hit. Also included was "Tell Her This", one of the group's most well-known songs.

Track listing

Initial copies of the UK release of the album included a second live disc (catalog number 588 399-2, which was not made available separately).

Mixed live for radio broadcast.

2014 expanded edition 
Disc 1 
as per the original album

Notes
Track 8 features additional vocals by singer and songwriter Jerry Burns. 
Track 16 recorded live at T in the Park; produced for Radio 1FM; first broadcast 17 September 1994.

Personnel
Credits adapted from the album liner notes.

Del Amitri
Justin Currie – vocals, bass, acoustic guitar
Iain Harvie – guitar
David Cummings – guitar
Andy Alston – keyboards
Additional musicians
Chris Sharrock – drums
Frazer Spiers – harmonica on "Food for Songs"
David Crichton – violin on "One Thing Left to Do"
David McCluskey – percussion
Martin Ditcham – percussion
Technical
Al Clay – producer, engineer
Bob Clearmountain – mixing
Mario Sorrenti – photography
Michael Nash Associates – design

Charts

Weekly charts

Year-end charts

Certifications

External links
Official Del Amitri homepage

Notes

Twisted
1995 albums
A&M Records albums